The 1979–80 international cricket season was from September 1979 to April 1980.

Season overview

September

Australia in India

November

Pakistan in India

1979–80 Benson & Hedges World Series

December

West Indies in Australia

England in Australia

February

West Indies in New Zealand

England in India

Australia in Pakistan

References

International cricket competitions by season
1979 in cricket
1980 in cricket